The Sat-Okh Museum of the Culture of North American Indians, also known as the Indian Museum, is a private permanent museum in Wymysłowo, Poland, devoted to the culture of the indigenous peoples of North America. It was opened in 2000 by Jan Kłodziński, with the help of the Polish Movement of Friends of Indians. It is dedicated to Sat-Okh, book author and book author and promoter of the culture of Native Americans, who claimed to be of Polish and Shawnee descent (with his claims remaining heavy contested).

Notes

References 

Ethnographic museums in Poland
Museums in Kuyavian-Pomeranian Voivodeship
Native American museums
Museums established in 2000
2000 establishments in Poland